Dietmar Lorenz (23 September 1950 – 8 September 2021) was an East German judoka, who competed for SC Dynamo Hoppegarten under the Sportvereinigung Dynamo.

Lorenz was born in the Saxon village of Langenbuch (Plauen rural district), which was incorporated into the newly founded Thuringian Schleiz district through the district  government reorganization of 1952 in the GDR. After starting at home, he came via SV Dynamo Schleiz  to SC Dynamo Hoppegarten, the sports club of the Volkspolizei, in 1969. He won medals at major international competitions, taking gold at the European Judo Championships and the World Judo Championships. He won as the first German at the Olympics and the Jigoro Kano Cup. As a member of the East German Olympic team, he took part in the 1980 Summer Olympics in Moscow. These games were boycotted by some countries, including Japan, whose Yasuhiro Yamashita and Sumio Endo were the reigning World Heavyweight and Open Class champions respectively.

He went as an outsider in the "Open Class" at the start. To the surprise of all judo experts, he defeated the favored opponents and also won the final battle against Angelo Parisi of France, who was twelve kilos heavier than him.

He was later a coach at SC Berlin for children. He wore the nanadan (七段:ななだん): seventh degree black belt (also, shichidan), a component of the Dan rank.

Lorenz died on 8 September 2021, aged 70.

References

External links
 Homepage
 

1950 births
2021 deaths
People from Schleiz
German male judoka
Sportspeople from Thuringia
Olympic judoka of East Germany
Judoka at the 1976 Summer Olympics
Judoka at the 1980 Summer Olympics
Olympic gold medalists for East Germany
Olympic bronze medalists for East Germany
Olympic medalists in judo
Medalists at the 1980 Summer Olympics
Recipients of the Patriotic Order of Merit in silver
20th-century German people